Qaiser Rashid Khan is a Pakistani jurist who is currently serving as the Chief Justice of Peshawar High Court.

Early life
He was born on 31 March 1961 in Thana, Malakand.

Education
Khan received his secondary education from Cadet College Kohat in 1976.

He earned his degree in Forensic science from Islamia College University in 1978 and graduated in 1981. He earned his Law degree from Khyber Law College in 1984 and his Master of Arts degree in Political science from the University of Peshawar in 1987 and a Master of Arts degree in journalism from the same university in 1991.

Career
Justice Qaiser Rashid Khan has been a Judge of the Peshawar High Court since 2 August 2011. He served as the Senior Justice of Peshawar High Court from 28 June 2018 until 16 November 2020. He was appointed as the Acting Chief Justice of Peshawar High Court on 16 November 2020. He took oath as the Chief Justice of Peshawar High Court on 9 January 2021.

References

1961 births
Living people
Judges of the Peshawar High Court
Pakistani judges